

Events
 January–March 
 January 4 – The stratovolcano Mount Parker in the Philippines) has a major eruption.
 January 14 – The Battle of Malacca concludes with the Dutch East India Company ending Portuguese control of Malacca.
 January 18 – The Junta de Braços (parliament) of Catalonia, led by Pau Claris, proclaims the Catalan Republic under French protection.
 February 16 – King Charles I of England gives his assent to the Triennial Act, reluctantly committing himself to parliamentary sessions of at least fifty days, every three years.
 March 7 – King Charles I of England decrees that all Roman Catholic priests must leave England by April 7 or face being arrested and treated as traitors.
 March 22 – The trial for high treason begins for Thomas Wentworth, 1st Earl of Strafford, director of England's Council of the North.
 March 27 – 
The Battle of Pressnitz begins between the Holy Roman Empire and Sweden.
The Siege of São Filipe begins in the Azores as the Portuguese Navy fights to drive the Spanish out. After almost 11 months, the Portuguese prevail on March 4, 1642.

 April–June 
 April 7 – The deadline for Catholic priests to leave England expires. Among those who refused to leave, Ambrose Barlow and William Ward become martyrs. Barlow surrenders on Easter Sunday, April 25, and hanged on September 10; he will be canonized as a saint in 1970. Ward is caught on July 15 and executed on July 26.
 April 15 – Aegidius Ursinus de Vivere is appointed by Pope Urban VII to be the Roman Catholic Church's Patriarch of Jerusalem. 
 April 21 – England's House of Commons votes 204 to 59 in favor of the conviction for treason and the execution of the Earl of Strafford, and the House of Lords acquiesces.  King Charles refuses to give the necessary royal assent.
 April 25 – The Wu Sangui#Battle of Songjin begins in what is now the North Korean city of Kimch'aek, but at the time part of the Chinese Empire controlled by the Ming dynasty. The Ming, led by General Wu Sangui, defeating the Qing rebels. 
 April 30 – In Morocco, rebel leader and secessionist Sidi al-Ayachi is assassinated. 
 May 3 – The Protestation of 1641 is passed by England's Parliament, requiring all officeholders to swear an oath of allegiance to King Charles I and to the Church of England.
 May 7 – England's House of Lords votes, 51 to 9, in favor of the execution of the Earl of Strafford for treason. In fear for his own safety, King Charles I signs Strafford's death warrant on May 10. 
 May 11 – The English Parliament passes the "Act against Dissolving Parliament without its own Consent". 
 May 12 – Thomas Wentworth, 1st Earl of Strafford, former director of England's Council of the North, is publicly beheaded in London in front of a crowd of thousands of people.  
 May 24 – The Isla de Providencia, a Caribbean island and haven for English pirates off of the coast of what is now Colombia, is captured in a joint operation of the Spanish Navy in an attack led by Don Francisco Díaz Pimienta, and the Portuguese Navy lea by the Count of Castel-Melhor Sousa. The expedition takes 770 prisoners, 380 slaves and a fortune in plundered gold and silver. 
 June 1 – In Paris, representatives of Portugal and France sign a treaty of alliance.
 June 2 – Bavarian and Spanish troops capture the town of Bad Kreuznach during the Thirty Years' War, 17 months after it had been taken in a French and Saxon attack. 
 June 12 – 
In India, at what is now the Rajasthan state, the Mughal Grand Vizier Abu'l-Hasan Asaf Khan is killed in a battle in Bundi against the armies of Nurpur, commanded by the Raja Jagat Singh. The elaborate Tomb of Asif Khan is constructed at Lahore (now part of Pakistan) on orders of the Mughal Emperor Jahangir.
The Treaty of The Hague is signed between representatives of the Dutch Republic and the Kingdom of Portugal as a 10-year truce and alliance.
 June 29 – The Battle of Wolfenbüttel takes place between a combined Swedish and French force against the Holy Roman Empire, with the Swedish-French Army driving back an Imperial assault.

 July–September 
 July 5 
The Norwegian city of Kristiansand is founded by King Christian IV of Denmark-Norway.
In England, the Long Parliament abolishes the Court of Star Chamber.
 July 12 – Portugal and the Dutch Republic sign a Treaty of Offensive and Defensive Alliance at The Hague. The treaty is not respected by both parties, and as a consequence has no effect in the Portuguese colonies (Brazil and Angola) that are under Dutch rule.
 August 10
 The Treaty of London between England and Scotland, ending the Bishops' Wars, is signed.
 Charles I of England flees London for the north.
 September  –
 September 14 – The Treaty of Péronne is signed between Honoré II, Prince of Monaco and France's King Louis XIII, guaranteeing the Grimaldi family the right to rule Monaco in return for the principality becoming a French protectorate.
 September 18 – 
In Germany, the Siege of Dorsten by the Holy Roman Empire ends after nine weeks with the surrender of the Landgraviate of Hesse-Kassel after the Hessians suffer 1,350 casualties.
In France, the siege of Bapaume ends with the surrender of the fortress by its Spanish occupiers.
More than 380 years later, treasure seekers have been unable to locate the wreckage.  

 October–December 
 October 2 – Scottish politician John Campbell takes office as the Lord Chancellor of Scotland and given the title of the Earl of Loudoun by Charles I in Charles's capacity as King of Scotland. 
 October 23 – Irish Rebellion of 1641 breaks out: Irish Catholic gentry, chiefly in Ulster, revolt against the English administration and Scottish settlers in Ireland.
 October 24 – The Irish rebel Sir Felim O'Neill of Kinard issues the Proclamation of Dungannon.
 November 4 – Battle of Cape St Vincent: A Dutch fleet, with Michiel de Ruyter as third in command, beats back a Spanish-Dunkirker fleet off the coast of Portugal.
 November 22 – By a vote of 159 to 148, the Long Parliament of England passes the Grand Remonstrance, with 204 specific objections to King Charles I's absolutist tendencies, and calling for the King to expel all Anglican bishops from the House of Lords.
 December 1 – The English Parliament presents the Grand Remonstrance to King Charles, who makes no response to it until Parliament has the document published and released to the general public. 
 December 7 – The bill for the Militia Ordinance is introduced by Arthur Haselrig, an anti-monarchist member of the House of Commons, proposing for the first time to allow Parliament to appoint its own military commanders without royal approval. King Charles, concerned that the legislation would allow parliament to create its own army, orders Haselrig arrested for treason. Parliament passes the Militia Ordinance on March 15.
 December 16 – Pope Urban VIII announces the creation of 12 new cardinals of the Roman Catholic Church
 December 23 – King Charles replies to the Grand Remonstrance and refuses to the demand for the removal of Catholic bishops from the House of Lords. Rioting breaks out in Westminster after the King's refusal is announced, and the 12 Anglican bishops stop attending meetings of the Lords.
 December 27 – According to a  journalist who witnessed the events of 1641, John Rushworth, the term "roundhead" is first used to describe supporters of the English Parliament who have challenged the authority of the monarchy. Rushworth writes later that during a riot on the 27th, one of the rioters, David Hide, draws his sword and, describing the short haircuts of the anti-monarchists, says that he would "cut the throat of those round-headed dogs that bawled against bishops." 
 December 30 – At the request of King Charles, John Williams, the Anglican Archbishop of York joins with 11 other bishops in disputing the legality of any legislation passed by the House of Lords during the time that the bishops were excluded. The House of Commons passes resolution to have the 12 bishops arrested. King Charles, in turn, issues an order on January 3 to have five members of the House of Commons arrested for treason.

 Date unknown 
 The Dutch found a trading colony on Dejima, near Nagasaki, Japan. 
 The Massachusetts Bay Colony adopts a law making witchcraft a capital crime.          
 Moses Amyraut's De l'elevation de la foy et de l'abaissement de la raison en la creance des mysteres de la religion is published.
 René Descartes' Meditations on First Philosophy is originally published.
 The town of Falun, Sweden is given city rights by Queen Kristina.
 A massive epidemic breaks out in northern and central China, just three years before the fall of the Ming dynasty. It races south down along the Grand Canal of China and the densely populated settlements there, from the northern terminus at Beijing, to the fertile Jiangnan region. In some local areas and towns it wipes out 90% of the local populace.

Births

January–March 
 January 6 – Wolfgang Dietrich of Castell-Remlingen, German nobleman (d. 1709)
 January 13 – Patrick Hume, 1st Earl of Marchmont, Scottish statesman (d. 1724)
 January 18 – François-Michel le Tellier, Marquis de Louvois, French war minister (d. 1691)
 February 2 – Claude de la Colombière, French Jesuit priest and saint (d. 1682)
 February 3 – Christian Albert, Duke of Holstein-Gottorp, Duke of Schleswig-Holstein-Gottorp (1659–1695) (d. 1695)
 February 4 – Jerolim Kavanjin, Croatian poet (d. 1714)
 February 8
 Richard Jones, 1st Earl of Ranelagh, Irish politician (d. 1712)
 Robert Knox, English sea captain in the service of the British East India Company (d. 1720)
 February 24 – Gabriel Tammelin, Lutheran clergyman (d. 1695)
 March 14 – Hyeonjong of Joseon, 18th monarch of the Korean Joseon Dynasty (d. 1674)
 March 19 – Abd al-Ghani al-Nabulsi, Muslim scholar (d. 1731)
 March 29 – Johann Zahn, 17th-century German author of Oculus Artificialis Teledioptricus Sive Telescopium (d. 1707)

April–June 
 April 4 – Sir James Oxenden, 2nd Baronet, English politician (d. 1708)
 April 8
 Henry Sydney, 1st Earl of Romney, English politician and army officer (d. 1704)
 (bapt.) – William Wycherley, English playwright (d. 1716)
 April 15 – Robert Sibbald, Scottish physician and antiquarian (d. 1722)
 May – Juan Núñez de la Peña, Spanish historian (d. 1721)
 May 8 – Nicolaes Witsen, Mayor of Amsterdam, Netherlands (d. 1717)
 May 16 – Dudley North, English economist, merchant and politician (d. 1691)
 May 17 – Pierre Monier, French painter (d. 1703)
 May 18 – Olimpia Giustiniani, Italian noblewoman (d. 1729)
 May 28 – Johann Weikhard von Valvasor, Slovenian polymath (d. 1693)
 May 31 – Patriarch Dositheos II of Jerusalem, Greek Orthodox Patriarch (d. 1707)
 June 15 – Bernard de la Monnoye, French lawyer (d. 1728)
 June 19 – Jan Claus, leading Quaker in Amsterdam (d. 1729)
 June 28 – Marie Casimire Louise de La Grange d'Arquien, French-born Polish consort to King John III Sobieski (d. 1716)
 June 29 – Pierre Cholonec, French Jesuit missionary and biographer in New France (d. 1723)
 June 30 – Meinhardt Schomberg, 3rd Duke of Schomberg, English general (d. 1719)

July–September 
 July 9 – Jan Jansen Bleecker, Mayor of Albany, New York (d. 1732)
 July 13 – Juan de Santiago y León Garabito, Spanish Catholic prelate, Bishop of Guadalajara and Bishop of Puerto Rico (d. 1694)
 July 14 – William Boynton, English politician (d. 1689)
 July 29 – Sir William Thomas, 1st Baronet, English Member of Parliament (d. 1706)
 July 30 – Regnier de Graaf, Dutch physician and anatomist (d. 1673)
 August – John Hathorne, American magistrate (d. 1717)
 August 2 – Jacob Bobart the Younger, English botanist (d. 1719)
 August 3 – Hildebrand Alington, 5th Baron Alington, Irish peer (d. 1723)
 August 28 – Henry, Prince of Nassau-Dillenburg (1662–1701) (d. 1701)
 September 1 – Jean Barbier d'Aucour, French lawyer and satirist (d. 1694)
 September 5 – Robert Spencer, 2nd Earl of Sunderland, English diplomat (d. 1702)
 September 7 – Tokugawa Ietsuna, Japanese Tokugawa shōgun (d. 1680)
 September 16 – Julius Francis, Duke of Saxe-Lauenburg, Bohemian noble (d. 1689)
 September 20 – Henri Arnaud, pastor of the Waldensians in Piedmont (d. 1721)
 September 22 – Titus van Rijn, Dutch art dealer (d. 1668)
 September 26 – Nehemiah Grew, English plant anatomist and physiologist (d. 1712)

October–December 
 October 1 – Hans Adam von Schöning, German general (d. 1696)
 October 5 – Françoise-Athénaïs de Rochechouart de Mortemart, mistress of Louis XIV of France (d. 1707)
 October 6 – Sir William Maynard, 1st Baronet, English politician (d. 1685)
 October 10 – Wolfgang Printz, German composer (d. 1717)
 October 14
 Dorothea Maria of Saxe-Weimar, Duchess of Saxe-Zeitz, by marriage Duchess of Saxe-Zeitz (d. 1675)
 Joachim Tielke, German musical instrument maker (d. 1719)
 October 28 – Philip Skippon, English naturalist and Member of Parliament (d. 1691)
 November 5 – Empress Xiaohuizhang, Qing Dynasty empress and consort of the Shunzhi Emperor of China (d. 1718)
 November 10 – Edward Lake, English churchman (d. 1704)
 November 14 – Albert Anton, Prince of Schwarzburg-Rudolstadt (1662–1710) (d. 1710)
 November 17 – André, marquis de Nesmond, French naval commander (d. 1702)
 November 23 – Anthonie Heinsius, Dutch statesman (d. 1720)
 December 7 – Louis, Count of Armagnac, French noble (d. 1718)
 December 11 – Jean-Louis Bergeret, holder of the 8th seat of the Académie française (d. 1694)
 December 20 – Urban Hjärne, Swedish chemist (d. 1724)
 December 29 – Pier Simone Fanelli, Italian painter (d. 1703)
 date unknown
 Pierre Allix, French Protestant clergyman (d. 1717)
 Diego Ladrón de Guevara, viceroy of Peru (d. 1718)
 Dodo von Knyphausen, German nobleman (d. 1698)

Deaths 

 January 3 – Jeremiah Horrocks, English astronomer (b. c. 1618)
 January 9 – Gustavus Adolphus of the Palatinate, German noble (b. 1632)
 January 11 
 Juan de Jáuregui, Spanish poet and painter (b. 1583)
 Franciscus Gomarus, Dutch theologian (b. 1563)
 February 15 – Sara Copia Sullam, Italian poet and writer (b. 1592)
 February 17 – Krisztina Nyáry, Hungarian noblewoman (b. 1604)
 February 24 – Francesco Usper, Italian composer (b. 1561)
 February 27 – Pau Claris i Casademunt, Catalan ecclesiastic (b. 1586)
 March 8 – Xu Xiake, Chinese adventurer and geographer (b. 1587)
 March 14 – Adam, Count of Schwarzenberg, German politician (b. 1583)
 March 23 – Claude Bernard, French priest (b. 1588)
 April 6 – Domenico Zampieri (Domenichino), Italian painter (b. 1581)
 April 13 – Richard Montagu, English clergyman (b. 1577)
 April 27 – Wilhelm von Rath, German soldier and scholar (b. 1585)
 May 10 – Johan Banér, Swedish soldier (b. 1596)
 May 12 –  Thomas Wentworth, 1st Earl of Strafford, English statesman (b. 1593)
 June 1 – Carlo Emanuele Pio di Savoia, Italian Catholic cardinal (b. 1585)
 July 4 
 István Esterházy Hungarian noble (b. 1616)
 Pedro Teixeira, Portuguese explorer
 July 6 
 Livia della Rovere, Italian noble (b. 1585)
 Louis, Count of Soissons (b. 1604)
 July 8 – Balthasar I Moretus, Flemish printer (b. 1574)
 July 13 – Nicolaes le Febure, Dutch Golden Age member of the Haarlem schutterij (b. 1589)
 July 21 – Thomas Mun, English writer on economics (b. 1571)
 July 24 – Giovanni Francesco Guidi di Bagno, Italian cardinal (b. 1578)
 August 4 – Otto III, Duke of Brunswick-Harburg (b. 1572)
 August 9 – Augustine Baker, Welsh Benedictine mystic (b. 1575)
 August 16 – Thomas Heywood, English playwright (b. c. 1573)
 August 26 – Jean-Jacques Bouchard, 17th-century French writer (b. 1606)
 September 10 – Ambrose Barlow, English Catholic martyr (b. 1585) (executed)
 September 12 – John Upton, English politician (b. 1590)
 October 3 – Étienne Martellange, French architect (b. 1569)
 October 31 –  Cornelis Jol, Dutch naval commander and privateer (b. 1597)
 November 9 
 Cardinal-Infante Ferdinand of Austria, Governor of the Netherlands and Bishop of Toledo (b. c. 1609)
 Maren Spliid, Danish alleged witch (b. c. 1600) (executed)
 November 11 – Christopher Clitherow, Lord Mayor of London and Member of Parliament (b. 1578)
 November 12 – Philipp Ludwig III, Count of Hanau-Münzenberg (1638–1641) (b. 1632)
 November 26 – Hedwig of Denmark, Danish princess (b. 1581)
 December 3 – John Percy, English priest (b. 1569)
 December 9 – Sir Anthony van Dyck, Flemish painter (b. 1599)
 December 22 – Maximilien de Béthune, Duke of Sully, 2nd Prime Minister of France (b. 1560)
 December 27 – Francis van Aarssens, Dutch diplomat (b. 1572)

Date unknown
 Estêvão de Brito, Portuguese composer (b. c. 1570)
 Arthur Johnston, Scottish physician and poet (b. c. 1579)
 Mukai Shogen Tadakatsu, Japanese admiral (b. 1582)
 Harjol, Chinese concubine of Hong Taiji (b. 1609)

References